The 2018 National Cup is the 26th edition of the Vietnamese Cup, the football knockout competition of Vietnam organized by the Vietnam Football Federation.

The schedule of the tournament was announced on 28 March 2018.

Qualifying round

Round of 16

Quarter-finals

1st Legs

2nd Legs

3-3 on aggregate. Hà Nội won on away goals.

Becamex Bình Dương won 4-1 on aggregate.

Sông Lam Nghệ An won 5-1 on aggregate.

FLC Thanh Hóa won 3-1 on aggregate.

Semi-finals

First leg

Second leg

3-3 on aggregate. Becamex Bình Dương won on away goals.

FLC Thanh Hóa won 6–3 on aggregate

Final
The final was played on 15 October.

Top scorers

References

External links
2018 Vietnamese Cup, vnleague.com

Vietnamese National Cup
2018 domestic association football cups
Cup